Alessandro Momo (26 November, 1956 – 19 November, 1974)  was an Italian actor, most noted for his role in 1973's  Malizia and in 1974's Scent of a Woman. He died in a motorcycle accident in Rome on 19 November 1974, a few days before he would have turned 18.

He began his career very young, as the protagonist in a series of fotoromanzi, also appearing together with Giusva Fioravanti.

He became famous thanks to his performances in the various film including The Police Serve the Citizens?, Lovers and Other Relatives, The Night of the Assassin, La scoperta and his role in Profumo di donna (Scent of a Woman), by Dino Risi, where he co-starred with Vittorio Gassman and Agostina Belli.

Momo died from a motorcycle accident in the weeks following the end of the making of the film. The motorcycle that had the fatal accident, a Honda CB750, was lent by his friend Eleonora Giorgi, who left for a trip; the actress was later investigated for reckless expectations because Momo was not yet 18 years of age and was not entitled to drive a motorcycle, according to the regulations at the time. Some time later, the singer Patrizio Sandrelli dedicated a song to his memory, which had some success, "Fratello in amore" ("Brother in Love"). Alessandro is buried in the cemetery of Verano, in Rome, along with his father Gabriele.

Filmography
(1969) La Scoperta (The Discovery)
(1970) Appuntamento col disonore (Rendezvous with Dishonour/The Night of the Assassin)
(1970) Il divorzio (The Divorce)
(1973) Il vero Coraggio (True Courage)
(1973) La Polizia è al Servizio del Cittadino? (The Police Serve the Citizens?)
(1973) Malizia (Malicious)
(1974) Peccato Veniale/Venial Sin (Lovers and Other Relatives)
(1974) Profumo di Donna (Scent of a Woman)

References

External links

1956 births
1974 deaths
Male actors from Rome
20th-century Italian male actors
Italian male film actors
Italian male television actors
Italian male child actors
Road incident deaths in Italy
Motorcycle road incident deaths
Burials at Campo Verano